William George Woodger (12 December 1887 – 25 January 1979) was an Australian army officer, auctioneer, real estate agent, soldier and stock and station agent. Woodger was born in Garryowen and died in Lane Cove.

See also

 Leslie Joseph Hooker

References

Australian Army officers
1887 births
1979 deaths
People from New South Wales
Australian auctioneers
Australian stock and station agents